Whoops or Whoop can refer to:

 Whoops (film), a 1993 Hungarian comedy
 Washington Public Power Supply System (WPPSS), commonly known as "Whoops", former name of Energy Northwest
 "Whoop", nickname of A. Barr Snively (c. 1899–1964), American football player and coach of lacrosse, football, and ice hockey
 "Whoops", nickname of Pat Creeden (1906–1992), American baseball player who played five games for the Boston Red Sox
 Whoop, an alternative name for the Hoopoe, a bird of the family Upupidae
 Woops!, an American sitcom TV series
 WHOOP (company), a wearable technology company
 Whoop Whoop, an Antarctic field camp

See also
 Woop (disambiguation)
 WOOHP, World Organization Of Human Protection, a fictional organization in the animated TV series Totally Spies!